Adwa (also known as Caaduba, Amoissa, or Dabita) (1733 m/5686 ft.) is a in Ethiopia, located in the western Somali Region region and has a 4 by 5 km caldera. Due to the location of the volcano near the boundary between Afar and Issa tribes, little is known about the past and present behavior of the volcano. However, an earthquake and InSAR study conducted by Derek Keir and colleagues shows that a magma intrusion around 5 km deep and 8 km long emanated away from the eastern side of the volcano in May 2000.

See also
List of stratovolcanoes

References

Mountains of Ethiopia
Stratovolcanoes of Ethiopia
Calderas of Ethiopia